The Athenaeum Club is a private club situated in Melbourne, Australia.

The club has been in operation since 1868 and celebrated its 150th anniversary in 2018.

References

External links 
Athenaeum Club website

Heritage-listed buildings in Melbourne
1868 establishments in Australia
Organizations established in 1868
Organisations based in Melbourne
Gentlemen's clubs in Australia
Clubs and societies in Victoria (Australia)
Collins Street, Melbourne
Buildings and structures in Melbourne City Centre